Bernard Lee (1908–1981) was an English actor who performed in many light entertainment media, including film, television and theatre. His career spanned from 1934 to 1981, although he made his first appearance on the stage at the age of six. He is perhaps best known for playing M in the first eleven Eon-produced James Bond films.

Lee trained at the Royal Academy of Dramatic Art, before making his professional stage debut in 1924.  He appeared on film for the first time in 1934 in the Leslie Howard Gordon-directed comedy The Double Event, where he played the part of Dennison. Although he was in wartime service with the Royal Sussex Regiment between 1940 and 1946, he had already been in several films, which were released between 1939 and 1943. He returned to acting after the war and was offered a role in the play Stage Door while awaiting his demob.

Lee appeared on stage and television dramatisations, as well as in more than 100 films. He was known for his roles as authority figures, often playing military characters, policemen or officials. Highlights in his career included The Third Man, The Blue Lamp, The Battle of the River Plate, Whistle Down the Wind and the James Bond series. Suffering from stomach cancer, Lee died in 1981; in his obituary The Guardian noted that Lee was a "solid and reliable character actor" who displayed "a rugged dependency".

Stage

 There is no evidence available to help with end dates for the productions.

Filmography

 The 1958 British Film and Television Yearbook also lists Lee as appearing in an undated film The Outsider, although it does not say whether this uncredited role was in the 1931 or 1939 film of that name. The 1942 International Motion Picture Almanac claims Lee appeared in The Tunnel (for Gaumont-British), Secret Agent (for Gaumont-British) and The Terror (for Alliance); this last is almost certainly the 1940 U.S. release of the 1938 British film listed above.

Television

References

Bibliography

External links
 
 
 
 

Male actor filmographies
British filmographies